{{DISPLAYTITLE:C20H11N2Na3O10S3}}
The molecular formula C20H11N2Na3O10S3 (molar mass: 604.47 g/mol, exact mass: 603.9269 u) may refer to:

 Amaranth (dye)
 Ponceau 4R